Edwin "Eddie" Mordue (5 January 1928 – 26 January 2011) was a British jazz saxophonist whose career spanned 70 years.

Born in South Shields in January 1928, Edwin Mordue moved to London in 1941 aged 13 and toured with 'Archie's Juvenile Band'. During the Second World War, he played tenor saxophone with the Eric Winstone Band where he met singer Julie Dawn, whom he married after the war. The couple went on to record and perform with Frank Sinatra, Gene Kelly and Sammy Davis, Jr. Eddie joined the Jack Nathan Band in 1951, a regular at the London Palladium and the emerging West End jazz scene, then worked as a freelance, loaning his sound to the benefit of Nat King Cole and Billie Holiday's last concert.

Many recordings followed in the 1960s including tracks with Dusty Springfield, Alexis Korner and Shirley Bassey. Eddie remarried in 1967, his wife, Gudrun, bore him three sons.

During the 1970s, Mordue played on a number of television shows including Top of the Pops, The Generation Game, The Two Ronnies, The Morecambe and Wise Show and Roy Castle's Record Breakers where he played the world's smallest soprano saxophone. He was a member of The Wombles. He also recorded on a number of film soundtracks including The Pink Panther with Henry Mancini and the James Bond films with John Barry.

In his later years, Mordue performed in concert halls and theatres on tour with the Ted Heath and Glenn Miller tribute bands.

Edwin Mordue died in January 2011.

References

External links

1928 births
2011 deaths
British jazz saxophonists
British male saxophonists
People from South Shields
Musicians from Tyne and Wear
British male jazz musicians
20th-century saxophonists